William Melvin Hicks (December 16, 1961 – February 26, 1994) was an American stand-up comedian, social critic, satirist, and musician. His material—encompassing a wide range of social issues including religion, politics, and philosophy—was controversial and often steeped in dark comedy.

At the age of 16, while still in high school, Hicks began performing at the Comedy Workshop in Houston, Texas. During the 1980s, he toured the U.S. extensively and made a number of high-profile television appearances, but he amassed a significant fan base in the UK, filling large venues during his 1991 tour. He also achieved some recognition as a guitarist and songwriter.

Hicks died of pancreatic cancer on February 26, 1994, at the age of 32. In subsequent years, his work gained significant acclaim in creative circles—particularly after a series of posthumous album releases—and he developed a substantial cult following. In 2007, he was number six on Channel 4's list of the "100 Greatest Stand-Up Comics", and rose to No. 4 on the 2010 list. In 2017, Rolling Stone magazine ranked him number 13 on its list of the 50 best stand-up comics of all time.

Early life
Hicks was born in Valdosta, Georgia, the son of James Melvin "Jim" Hicks (1923–2006) and Mary (Reese) Hicks. He had an older sister, Lynn, and an older brother, Steve. The family lived in Alabama, Florida, and New Jersey, before settling in Houston, Texas, when Hicks was seven years old. He was drawn to comedy at an early age, emulating Woody Allen and Richard Pryor, and wrote routines with his friend Dwight Slade. While attending Stratford High School, he began performing comedy (mostly derivations of Woody Allen material) for his classmates. At home, he wrote his own one-liners and slid them under the bedroom door of Steve, who he thought was a genius, for critical analysis. Steve told him, "Keep it up. You're really good at this."

Early on, Hicks began to mock his family's Southern Baptist religious beliefs. He joked to the Houston Post in 1987, "We were Yuppie Baptists. We worried about things like, 'If you scratch your neighbor's Subaru, should you leave a note?'" Biographer Cynthia True described a typical argument with his father:

He was close with his family his whole life, though, and he did not reject spiritual ideology itself, and throughout his life, he sought various alternative methods of experiencing it. Kevin Slade, elder brother of Dwight, introduced him to Transcendental Meditation and other forms of spirituality. Over one Thanksgiving weekend, he took Hicks and Dwight to a Transcendental Meditation residence course in Galveston. Worried about his rebellious behavior, his parents took him to a psychoanalyst at age 17. According to Hicks, the analyst took him aside after the first group session and told him, "You can continue coming if you want to, but it's them, not you."

Career

Beginnings
Hicks was associated with the Texas Outlaw Comics group developed at the Comedy Workshop in Houston in the 1980s.

California and New York
By January 1986, Hicks was using recreational drugs and his financial resources had dwindled. His career received another upturn in 1987, however, when he appeared on Rodney Dangerfield's Young Comedians Special. The same year, he moved to New York City, and for the next five years, performed about 300 times a year. On the album Relentless, he jokes that he quit using drugs because "once you've been taken aboard a UFO, it's kind of hard to top that", although in his performances, he continued to enthusiastically praise the virtues of LSD, marijuana, and psychedelic mushrooms.

He eventually fell back to chain smoking, a theme that figured heavily in his performances from then on. His nicotine addiction, love of smoking, and occasional attempts to quit became a recurring theme in his act throughout his later years.

In 1988, Hicks signed with his first professional business manager, Jack Mondrus.

On the track "Modern Bummer" of his 1990 album Dangerous, Hicks says he quit drinking alcohol in 1988.

In 1989, he released his first video, Sane Man; a remastered version with 30 minutes of extra footage was released in 1999.

Early fame

In 1990, Hicks released his first album, Dangerous, performed on the HBO special One Night Stand, and performed at Montreal's Just for Laughs festival. Hicks was later engaged to his manager, Colleen McGarr, who booked him there. He was also part of a group of American stand-up comedians performing in London's West End in November. Hicks was a huge hit in the UK and Ireland and continued touring there throughout 1991. That year, he returned to Just for Laughs and filmed his second video, Relentless.

Hicks made a brief detour into musical recording with the Marble Head Johnson album in 1992, collaborating with Houston high school friend Kevin Booth and Austin, Texas, drummer Pat Brown. During the same year, he toured the UK, where he recorded the Revelations video for Britain's Channel 4. He closed the show with his soon-to become-famous philosophy regarding life, "It's Just a Ride." Also in that tour, he recorded the stand-up performance released in its entirety on a double CD titled Salvation. Hicks was voted "Hot Standup Comic" by Rolling Stone magazine in 1993. He moved to Los Angeles in 1992.

Hicks and Tool
Progressive metal band Tool invited Hicks to open a number of concerts in its 1993 Lollapalooza appearances, where Hicks once asked the audience to look for a contact lens he had lost. Thousands of people complied.

Members of Tool felt that Hicks and they "were resonating similar concepts". Intending to raise awareness about Hicks's material and ideas, Tool dedicated their triple-platinum album Ænima (1996) to Hicks. Both the lenticular casing of the Ænima album packaging and the chorus of the title track "Ænema" make reference to a sketch from Hicks's Arizona Bay album, in which he contemplates the idea of Los Angeles falling into the Pacific Ocean. Ænimas final track, "Third Eye", contains samples from Hicks's Dangerous and Relentless albums.

An alternate version of the Ænima artwork shows a painting of Bill Hicks, calling him "Another Dead Hero", and mentions of Hicks are found both in the liner notes and on the record.

Censorship and aftermath
In 1984, Hicks was invited to appear on Late Night with David Letterman for the first time. He had a joke that he used frequently in comedy clubs about how he caused a serious accident that left a classmate using a wheelchair. NBC had a policy that no handicapped jokes could be aired on the show, making his stand-up routine difficult to perform without mentioning words such as "wheelchair".

On October 1, 1993, Hicks was scheduled to appear on Late Show with David Letterman on CBS, where Letterman had recently moved. It was his 12th appearance on a Letterman late-night show, but his entire performance was removed from the broadcast' at that point, it was the only occasion where a comedian's entire routine was cut after taping. Hicks's stand-up routine was removed from the show, Hicks said, because Letterman's producers believed the material, which included jokes involving religion and the antiabortion movement, was unsuitable for broadcast. Producer Robert Morton initially blamed CBS, which denied responsibility; Morton later conceded it was his decision. Although Letterman later expressed regret at the way Hicks had been handled, Hicks did not appear on the show again. Hicks was undergoing chemotherapy at the time of his final Late Show appearance, unbeknownst to Letterman, and most others outside of Hicks's family, and died less than four months later.

Letterman finally aired the censored routine in its entirety on January 30, 2009. Hicks's mother, Mary, was present in the studio and appeared on-camera as a guest. Letterman took responsibility for the original decision to remove Hicks's set from the 1993 show. "It says more about me as a guy than it says about Bill," he said, after the set aired, "because there was absolutely nothing wrong with that".

Denis Leary's plagiarism
For many years, Hicks was friends with fellow comedian Denis Leary, but in 1993, he was angered by Leary's album No Cure for Cancer, which featured lines and subject matter similar to his own routine. According to American Scream: The Bill Hicks Story by Cynthia True, upon hearing the album Hicks was furious. "All these years, aside from the occasional jibe, he had pretty much shrugged off Leary's lifting. Comedians borrowed, stole stuff, and even bought bits from one another. Milton Berle and Robin Williams were famous for it. This was different. Leary had practically taken line for line huge chunks of Bill's act and recorded it." The friendship ended abruptly as a result.

At least three stand-up comedians have gone on the record stating they believe Leary stole Hicks's material, as well as his persona and attitude. In an interview, when Hicks was asked why he had quit smoking, he answered, "I just wanted to see if Denis would, too." In another interview, Hicks said, "I have a scoop for you. I stole his [Leary's] act. I camouflaged it with punchlines, and to really throw people off, I did it before he did." During a 2003 Comedy Central Roast of Denis Leary, comedian Lenny Clarke, a friend of Leary's, said a carton of cigarettes was backstage from Bill Hicks, with the message, "Wish I had gotten these to you sooner." This joke was cut from the final broadcast.

The controversy surrounding plagiarism is also mentioned in American Scream:

Material and style
Hicks's performance style was seen as a play on his audience's emotions. He expressed anger, disgust, and apathy while addressing the audience in a casual and personal manner, which he likened to merely conversing with his friends. He would invite his audiences to challenge authority and the existential nature of "accepted truth." One such message, which he often used in his shows, was delivered in the style of a news report (to draw attention to the negative slant news organizations give to any story about drugs):

American philosopher and ethnomycologist Terence McKenna was a frequent source of Hicks's most controversial psychedelic and philosophical counter-cultural material; he infamously acted out an abridged version of McKenna's "Stoned Ape" model of human evolution as a routine during several of his final shows.

Another of Hicks's most-delivered lines was given during a gig in Chicago during 1989 (later released as the bootleg I'm Sorry, Folks). After a heckler repeatedly shouted "Free Bird", Hicks screamed, "Hitler had the right idea; he was just an underachiever!" Hicks followed this remark with a misanthropic tirade calling for unbiased genocide against the whole of humanity.

Much of Hicks's routine involved direct attacks on mainstream society, religion, politics, and consumerism. Asked in a BBC interview why he cannot do a routine that appeals "to everyone", he said that such an act was impossible. He responded by repeating a comment that an audience member once made to him, "We don't come to comedy to think!", to which he replied, "Gee, where do you go to think? I'll meet you there!" When asked whether a "half way" point existed between audience expectations and his own, he said: "but my way is half-way between, I mean, this is a night club, and, you know, these are adults, and what do you expect?" Hicks was strongly against political correctness, and jokingly stated that the politically correct should be "hunted down and killed."

Hicks often discussed popular conspiracy theories in his performances, most notably the assassination of President John F. Kennedy. He mocked the Warren Report and the official version of Lee Harvey Oswald as a "lone nut assassin." He also questioned the guilt of David Koresh and the Branch Davidian compound during the Waco Siege. Hicks ended some of his shows, especially those being recorded in front of larger audiences as albums, with a mock "assassination" of himself on stage, making gunshot sound effects into the microphone while falling to the ground.

Illness and death
On June 16, 1993, Hicks was diagnosed with pancreatic cancer that had spread to his liver.
He started receiving weekly chemotherapy, while still touring and also recording his album, Arizona Bay, with Booth. He was also working with comedian Fallon Woodland on a pilot episode of a new talk show, titled Counts of the Netherworld for Channel 4 at the time of his death. The budget and concept had been approved, and a pilot was filmed. The Counts of the Netherworld pilot was shown at the various Tenth-Anniversary Tribute Night events around the world on February 26, 2004. 

After being diagnosed with cancer, Hicks often joked that any given performance could be his last; the public, however, was unaware of his condition, and only a few close friends and family members knew of the disease. He performed the final show of his career at Caroline's in New York on January 6, 1994; he moved back to his parents' house in Little Rock shortly thereafter. In his last weeks, he re-read J. R. R. Tolkien's The Lord of the Rings, and made telephone calls to friends to say goodbye before he stopped speaking on February 14.

Hicks died on February 26, 1994, in Little Rock at the age of 32. He was buried in the family grave plot in Magnolia Cemetery, Leakesville, Mississippi.

In early 1995, Hicks' family released a brief essay he had written mere weeks before his death:

Legacy
His albums Arizona Bay and Rant in E-Minor were released posthumously in 1997 on the Voices imprint of the Rykodisc label. Dangerous and Relentless were re-released simultaneously.

In a 2005 poll to find the Comedian's Comedian, comedians and comedy insiders voted Hicks 13th on their list of "The Top 20 Greatest Comedy Acts Ever". In "Comedy Central Presents: 100 Greatest Stand-ups of All Time" (2004), Hicks was ranked 19th. In March 2007, he was voted sixth on Britain's Channel 4 list of the 100 Greatest Stand-Up Comics, and rose to number four on the 2010 list.

Devotees have incorporated Hicks's words, image, and attitude into their own creations. By means of audio sampling, fragments of his rants, diatribes, social criticisms, and philosophies have found their way into many musical works, such as the live version of Super Furry Animals' "The Man Don't Give a Fuck" and Adam Freeland's "We Want Your Soul". His influence on the band Tool is well documented as he is sampled at the beginning of their song "Third Eye"Ænima (1996); he "appears" on the Fila Brazillia album Maim That Tune (1995) and on SPA's eponymously titled album SPA (1997), which are both dedicated to Hicks; the British band Radiohead's second album The Bends (1995) is also dedicated to his memory. American indie rock band Built to Spill's song "Planting Seeds" on its 2009 album There Is No Enemy alludes to Hicks's routine on advertising and marketing, which appears on the performance film Bill Hicks: Revelations. Singer/songwriter Tom Waits listed Rant in E-Minor as one of his 20 most cherished albums of all time.

Comedians who have cited Hicks as an inspiration include Joe Rogan, Dave Attell, Lewis Black, Patton Oswalt, David Cross, Russell Brand, Ron White, Frankie Boyle, Jimmy Dore, and Brendon Burns.  The political cartoonist "Mr. Fish" described in 2022 how he learned from Bill Hicks.  

British actor Chas Early portrayed Hicks in the one-man stage show Bill Hicks: Slight Return, which premiered in 2004. The show was co-written by Early and Richard Hurst, and imagined Hicks's view of the world 10 years after his death.

Hicks is mentioned in the 1999 British film Human Traffic. In the movie, the young and hip club-going protagonist, "Jip", praises Hicks as an alternative thinker, and explains that he needs to get a regular infusion of Hicks's insights. Before leaving his house to start on the movie's main adventure, Jip states: "... first a daily injection of the late prophet Bill Hicks ... just to remind me not to take life too seriously." He then watches a clip of one of Hicks's rants about drugs, and how they had never affected him badly.

On February 25, 2004, British MP Stephen Pound tabled an early day motion titled "Anniversary of the Death of Bill Hicks" (EDM 678 of the 2003–04 session), the text of which reads:

Hicks appeared in a flashback scene in writer Garth Ennis's Vertigo comic-book series Preacher, in the story "Underworld" in issue No. 31 (Nov. 1997).

Hicks is the subject of at least two tribute songs, including "Bill Hicks" released in 2000 by fellow Texan Ed Hamell of Hamell on Trial, and the 2007 “Bill Hicks” by Australian gypsy-blues group Juke Baritone and the Swamp Dogs.

Rock band Clutch mentions Hicks in the song "How to Shake Hands" from their 2018 album, Book of Bad Decisions. "First thing that I'm gonna do is disclose all those U.F.O.s, put Jimi Hendrix on the 20-dollar bill, and Bill Hicks on a five note".

Folk musician Roxanne de Bastion dedicated her 2012 song "Here's Tom with the Weather", inspired by the eponymous quote, to Bill Hicks.

English songwriter-musician Charlie Dore wrote the folk ballad song, "When Bill Hicks Died", for her album, Cuckoo Hill, released in 2006.

Film and documentary
 Annex Houston (1986) (bootleg): A video of an early stand-up performance live in Texas
 Sane Man (1989): The first official video recorded Bill Hicks' show
 Ninja Bachelor Party (1991): A 1991 low-budget comedy film produced by and starring Bill Hicks, Kevin Booth, and David Johndrow
 One Night Stand (1991): A half-hour performance recorded for the HBO stand-up series
 Relentless (1992): Recorded at the Centaur Theatre during the annual Just for Laughs Comedy Festival in Montreal, Quebec, Canada, despite the title, the CD version of Relentless was recorded at a separate performance, after the Just for Laughs festival had closed.
 Revelations (1992): A live performance at the Dominion Theatre, London in November 1992.

A documentary titled American: The Bill Hicks Story, based on interviews with his family and friends, premiered on March 12, 2010, at the South by Southwest Film Festival in Austin, Texas.

Russell Crowe announced in 2012 that he would direct a Bill Hicks biopic. Crowe was originally thought to be playing the comedian, but Mark Staufer, the actor's schoolmate and writer on the film, suggested the part is now open for casting. Joseph Gordon-Levitt was frequently mentioned as a popular choice by fans. Production was expected to start in 2013, but, as of 2018, no further announcements regarding the film's progress have been made.

On October 28, 2018, it was announced that Richard Linklater is set to direct a biopic about Bill Hicks for the film production company Focus Features.

Discography

Bibliography
Love All the People: Letters, Lyrics, Routines

References

Further reading

External links

 
 Bill Hicks's Last Interview 1993
 
 

1961 births
1994 deaths
20th-century American comedians
American conspiracy theorists
American satirists
American religious skeptics
American political commentators
American social commentators
American media critics
American stand-up comedians
American male comedians
Anti-consumerists
Deaths from cancer in Arkansas
Religious controversies in stand-up comedy
Obscenity controversies in stand-up comedy
Censorship in the arts
Childfree
Comedians from Georgia (U.S. state)
Comedians from Texas
Critics of creationism
Critics of religions
Deaths from pancreatic cancer
Former Baptists
John F. Kennedy conspiracy theorists
Entertainers from Houston
People from Valdosta, Georgia
American psychedelic drug advocates
Rykodisc artists
American deists